Steven Ugarkovic (born 19 August 1994) is a Croatian Australian footballer who plays as a defensive midfielder for A-League club Wellington Phoenix.

Career
After joining the Newcastle Jets in the middle of the 2015/16 season, Ugarkovic and Ben Kantarovski carved out a fantastic partnership in the middle of the park which has been the backbone to much of the Jets' strength in attack. The highlight of his time so far with the Newcastle Jets so far has been the goal which secured the Jets' their first win in Gosford in nearly 3000 days. Ugarkovic scored the lone goal in a 1–0 win over the Mariners in February 2016. Ugarkovic's first appearance for the Newcastle Jets was on 31 January 2016, in a 1–0 loss to Adelaide United.

His father, John Ugarkovic, played in the NSL for Sydney United.

Career statistics

References

External links
 

1994 births
Living people
Soccer players from Sydney
Australian people of Croatian descent
Association football midfielders
Croatian footballers
Croatia youth international footballers
Australian soccer players
Australia under-23 international soccer players
NK Osijek players
HNK Gorica players
Newcastle Jets FC players
Western Sydney Wanderers FC players
Wellington Phoenix FC players
Croatian Football League players
First Football League (Croatia) players
A-League Men players
People educated at Oakhill College
Australian expatriate soccer players
Expatriate association footballers in New Zealand
Australian expatriate sportspeople in New Zealand